Microfrontend is a front-end web development pattern in which a single application may be built from disparate builds. It is analogous to a microservices approach but for client-side single-page applications written in JavaScript. It is a solution to de-composition and routing for multiple front-end applications.

Microfrontend using the following three approaches:

 With Module Federation
 With Web Components
 With IFrames

One company that uses microfrontends is IKEA.

For Webpack this concept is referred to as module federation.

References

Software design patterns
Architectural pattern (computer science)
Web services